Robertsbridge Community College is a coeducational secondary school located in Robertsbridge in the English county of East Sussex.

It was established in 1955 as Robertsbridge County Secondary School, and was renamed Robertsbridge Community College in 1993. Today, it is a community school administered by East Sussex County Council. In 2020 the school opened a SEND unit for pupils with Autism and other learning disabilities. The school was graded 'Good' in its most recent (2022) Ofsted report.

Robertsbridge Community College offers GCSEs, BTECs and NCFE awards as programmes of study for pupils. Pupils can also participate in The Duke of Edinburgh's Award programme.

Notable former pupils
Sarah Keith-Lucas, meteorologist and weather presenter
George Marsh, footballer

References

External links 
 

Robertsbridge
Community schools in East Sussex
Secondary schools in East Sussex
Educational institutions established in 1955
1955 establishments in England